Straight Ahead is a live album by drummer Art Blakey and The Jazz Messengers recorded at the Keystone Korner in San Francisco in 1981 and released on the Concord Jazz label.

Reception

Scott Yanow, writing for AllMusic, described it as "One of the best recordings by Art Blakey's 1981 Jazz Messengers... Highly recommended".

Track listing 
 "Falling In Love with Love" (Lorenz Hart, Richard Rodgers) - 7:52   
 "My Romance" (Hart, Rodgers) - 3:30   
 "Webb City" (Bud Powell) - 9:53   
 "How Deep Is the Ocean?" (Irving Berlin) - 9:32   
 "E.T.A." (Bobby Watson) - 6:09   
 "The Theme" (Miles Davis) - 2:56

Personnel 
Art Blakey - drums
Wynton Marsalis - trumpet
Bobby Watson - alto saxophone
Bill Pierce - tenor saxophone
James Williams - piano
Charles Fambrough - bass

References 

1981 live albums
Art Blakey live albums
The Jazz Messengers live albums
Concord Records live albums
Music of the San Francisco Bay Area
Albums recorded at Keystone Korner